Leo Douglas Goeas (born August 15, 1966) is a former American football offensive lineman who played in the National Football League from 1990 through 1997.  He played college football at the University of Hawaii.

1966 births
Living people
Players of American football from Honolulu
American football offensive linemen
Hawaii Rainbow Warriors football players
San Diego Chargers players
Los Angeles Rams players
St. Louis Rams players
Baltimore Ravens players
Ed Block Courage Award recipients